The city of Accra, capital of Ghana, is officially divided into five geographical regions: North, West, East, Central and south - and eleven sub-metropolitan areas: Osu Klottey, Ablekuma North, Ablekuma South, Ayawaso Central, Ayawaso East, Ayawaso North, Ayawaso West, La, Okaikoi North, Okaikoi South, Abossey Okai, and Ashiedu Keteke. The word "neighbourhood" can take on various official and unofficial meanings. There are, however, 50 official neighbourhoods (i.e. planned and unplanned anchor neighbourhoods) within the city limits of Accra.

"Neighbourhoods" exist on both large and small scales. Osu, Jamestown and Usshertown, established during the colonial era, have well-defined boundaries by virtue of their siting around the respective forts of Christiansborg, James Fort, and Ussher Fort. The unplanned nature of the city has resulted in the development of slums and much smaller communities within officially recognized neighbourhoods with a well-defined centre but poorly identified extremities.

Overview 
Accra's expansion has influenced the naming of certain neighbourhoods, such as the Airport Residential Area, North Ridge, East Ridge, West Ridge, West Legon/Westlands, East Legon, and Korle Gonno.

Accra Central 
Downtown Accra is the site of the government ministries, and the districts of Victoriaborg, West Ridge, and East Ridge.

Surrounding downtown are the neighbourhoods of the Adabraka, Asylum Down, Jamestown, Swalaba, North Ridge, Tudu and Christiansborg/Osu. Osu-RE to be precise is arguably the liveliest part of Accra and the most preferred hang-out spot for tourists visiting the city.

Accra North 
North of downtown, the neighbourhood of Airport Residential Area, so named because of its proximity to the Kotoka International Airport, is one of the wealthiest neighbourhoods in Accra. East Legon and West Legon/Westlands are also wealthy neighbourhoods inhabited by wealthy Ghanaians, academics, government officials, and ex-patriates. Other neighbourhoods located in the expansive northern section of Accra are Roman Ridge, Kanda, Dzorwulu, East Legon, Kaneshie, North Kaneshie, Accra New Town, Nima, Kokomlemle, Tesano, Maamobi, Alajo, Christian Village, Apenkwa, Darkuman, Awoshie, Avenor, Kwashieman, Achimota, Bubiashie, Kotobabi, Abelemkpe, Bawaleshie, and Abeka.

Accra West 
West of downtown are the neighbourhoods of Korle Gonno, Lartebiokorshie, Abossey Okai, Mataheko, Mpoase, Chorkor, Dansoman, Mamprobi, and Odorkor. Dansoman is Accra's largest neighbourhood and predominantly a working-class community, considered to be Accra's most diverse. However, it is stated emphatically and well documented that Mamprobi is not part of Dansoman and still remains a controversial topic Korle Gonno borders Korle-Bu Hospital, which doubles as the teaching hospital of the University of Ghana.

Accra East 
East of downtown are the neighbourhoods of Cantonments (the site of the U.S. Embassy in Ghana), Labadi, La, Burma Camp, and Airport Hills.

Neighbourhood areas 
Following the years of Accra's prosperity after World War II, and Kwame Nkrumah's emphasis on the development of Accra and its immediate environs after independence, Accra was the favoured destination for job-seeking migrants. This phenomenon brought about the development of unplanned communities on the periphery of the limits of Accra at the time. Over the years, these suburban areas were absorbed into the urban area of Accra and created a dichotomy between planned and unplanned settlements within the city.

Planned neighbourhoods 
Currently, most of Accra's 22 planned neighbourhoods were developed in the colonial era and are inhabited by rich Ghanaians and expatriates.
 Victoriaborg
 East Ridge
 West Ridge
 North Ridge
 Adabraka

 Asylum Down
 McCarthy Hill
 Airport Hills
 Airport Residential Area
 Roman Ridge
 Kanda
 Dzorwulu
 East Legon
 Kaneshie
 Kokomlemle
 Tesano
 West Legon/Westlands
 Abelemkpe
 Cantonments
 Labone
 Burma Camp (formerly Giffard Camp)
 Chorkor
 Mamprobi
 Korle Bu
 Korle Gonno
 Lartebiokorshie
 Mataheko
 Dansoman
 Adenta

Unplanned neighbourhoods 
Given the disproportionate rate of expansion of the city and the provision of basic infrastructure and services, unplanned neighbourhoods are characterized by poor road networks, poor drainage systems, and insufficient water and electricity services. Although not mutually exclusive, these unplanned settlements can be further distinguished from slums, where a slum is defined as a run-down area of a city characterized by substandard housing and squalor and lacking in tenure security. For purposes of this article, a slum will further be categorized as an area of severely low income where working migrants living in makeshift accommodations are the majority.
 Agbogbloshie
 Nima
 Kpehe
 Awoshie
 Alajo
 Avenor
 Kotobabi
 Bawaleshie
 Christian Village
 Pig Farm
 Accra New Town
 Maamobi
 Abeka
 Lapaz
 Darkuman
 Achimota
 Teshie
 Odorkor
 Nii Boi Town
 Akweteyman
 Mantseman
 Abossey Okai
 Apenkwa
 Bubiashie
 Mpoase

Slums 
 Agbogbloshie
 Sabon Zongo
 Old Fadama (Sodom and Gomorrah)
 Lavender Hill (Accra)
 Abuja
 Chemuna
 Gbegbeyise
 Chorkor

List of communities within neighbourhoods 
Within some of the neighbourhoods in Accra are smaller communities listed below. Taking into account the slums, communities, planned and unplanned neighbourhoods, unofficially there are approximately 120 neighbourhoods within the city limits of Accra.
 Victoriaborg
 Ministries
 Kinbu
 East Ridge
 Gold Coast City
 West Ridge
 Ambassadorial Enclave
 Usshertown
 Makola
 High Street
 Rawlings Park
 Osu
 Ringway Estates
 Kuku Hill
 Osu-Ako Adjei
 Osu-Alata/Ashante
 Osu-RE
 Osu Kinkawe
 Cantonments
 El-Wak
 East Cantonments
 Airport Residential Area
 Airport City
 HIPC Junction
 Spintex
 Adabraka
 Circle
 Odawna
 Dansoman
 Russia
 Sahara
 Sukura
 Shiabu
 Dansoman Estates
 Santa Maria
 Old Dansoman
 Dansoman Amanhoma
 SSNIT Flats
 Akokorfoto
 Tweneboa
 Sakaman
 Kaneshie
 Awudome
 First Light
 North Kaneshie
 Kwashieman
 West Legon/Westlands
 Kisseman
 Christian Village
 Haatso
 Abelemkpe
 Old Abelemkpe
 New Abelemkpe/Abelemkpe Forest
 Airport Residential Area
 Legion Village
 East Airport
 Villagio
 Manet
 Usshertown
 Okaishie
 Tudu
 East Legon
 Shiashie
 Bawaleshie
 South Shiashie
 Okplongo
 Adjiriganor
 Nmai Djorn
 Awoshie
 Odorgornor
 Regimanuel Estates
 Lartebiokorshie
 Sabon Zango
 Zoti Area
 Odorkor
 North Odorkor
 South Odorkor
 Official Town
 Labadi
 South Labadi
 Labadi-Aborm
 Tesano
 South Tesano
 Teshie Nungua
 Mamprobi
 Mamobi
 Nima
 New Mamprobi
 Kanda 441
 Kanda Estates
 "37"

References 

 
Ghana geography-related lists